Romano Bonagura (15 October 1930 – 30 October 2010) was an Italian bobsledder who competed from the late 1950s to the mid-1960s, born in Ravenna. He won the silver medal in the two-man event at the 1964 Winter Olympics in Innsbruck.

Bonagura also won six medals at the FIBT World Championships with one gold (Four-man: 1963), four silvers (Two-man: 1962, 1963; Four-man: 1959, 1962), and one bronze (Two-man: 1961).

References
 Bobsleigh two-man Olympic medalists 1932-56 and since 1964
 Bobsleigh two-man world championship medalists since 1931
 Bobsleigh four-man world championship medalists since 1930
 DatabaseOlympics.com profile
 Romano Bonagura's obituary 

1930 births
2010 deaths
Sportspeople from Ravenna
Bobsledders at the 1964 Winter Olympics
Italian male bobsledders
Olympic bobsledders of Italy
Olympic silver medalists for Italy
Olympic medalists in bobsleigh
Medalists at the 1964 Winter Olympics